Michael Dwyer (born 10 October 1962) is a Canadian former athlete who competed in sprint events.

Born in Jamaica, Dwyer came to Canada as a teenager in 1976.

Dwyer had a personal best time in the 200m of 20.83 and won a bronze medal for the 200m at the 1985 Pacific Conference Games. He was sixth in the same event at the 1986 Commonwealth Games.

As a 4x100m relay runner he was a member of silver medal winning teams at the 1985 Summer Universiade and 1991 Pan American Games. He was fourth in the 4x100m relay at the 1987 World Championships, running with Ben Johnson, Atlee Mahorn and Desai Williams.

References

External links
 
 
 
 

1962 births
Living people
Canadian male sprinters
Black Canadian track and field athletes
Jamaican emigrants to Canada
World Athletics Championships athletes for Canada
Commonwealth Games competitors for Canada
Athletes (track and field) at the 1986 Commonwealth Games
Athletes (track and field) at the 1990 Commonwealth Games
Competitors at the 1990 Goodwill Games
Universiade silver medalists for Canada
Universiade medalists in athletics (track and field)
Medalists at the 1985 Summer Universiade
Medalists at the 1991 Pan American Games
Athletes (track and field) at the 1991 Pan American Games
Pan American Games medalists in athletics (track and field)
Pan American Games silver medalists for Canada